Mitiaro is a Cook Islands electoral division returning one member to the Cook Islands Parliament.  Its current representative is Tangata Vavia, who has held the seat since 1994.

The electorate consists of the island of Mitiaro.

Members of Parliament for Mitiaro
Unless otherwise stated, all MPs terms began and ended at general elections.

Election results

2006 election

2004 election

References

Mitiaro
Cook Islands electorates